Bajigur (sundanese script: , also known as Sundanese coconut latte) is a hot and sweet beverage native to the Sundanese people of West Java, Indonesia. The main ingredients are coconut milk and Aren sugar; usually to add taste, a small amount of ginger and a small pinch of salt. Traditionally fragrant pandan leaves were added, but now often artificial vanilla powder is used. It can also include kopi tubruk, finely pounded coffee.

This beverage is served hot and is sold through vendor carts traveling in villages and residential areas. The carts are equipped with portable stoves to keep the beverage hot. Bajigur is considered suitable to be consumed in cool highlands, or during cold nights or rainy days to warm oneself. The beverage is usually accompanied with traditional snacks such as steamed banana, boiled sweet potato or boiled peanuts.

In Javanese language, the term "bajigur" was used as a euphemism for the swear word "bajingan" or "bajirut".

See also

 Bandrek - a similar Indonesian drink, with ginger
 List of hot beverages
 List of Indonesian beverages
 Wedang Jahe

References 

Hot drinks
Indonesian drinks
Sundanese cuisine
Foods containing coconut